In probability and statistics, the skewed generalized “t” distribution is a family of continuous probability distributions. The distribution was first introduced by Panayiotis Theodossiou in 1998. The distribution has since been used in different applications. There are different parameterizations for the skewed generalized t distribution.

Definition

Probability density function

In the original parameterization of the skewed generalized t distribution, 
 
and 
.

This gives a mean of

and a variance of

The  parameter controls the skewness of the distribution. To see this, let  denote the mode of the distribution, and 

Thus the skewed generalized t distribution can be highly skewed as well as symmetric. If , then the distribution is negatively skewed. If , then the distribution is positively skewed. If , then the distribution is symmetric.

Finally,  and  control the kurtosis of the distribution. As  and  get smaller, the kurtosis increases (i.e. becomes more leptokurtic).

Moments

Let  be a random variable distributed with the skewed generalized t distribution.

Special Cases

Special and limiting cases of the skewed generalized t distribution include the skewed generalized error distribution, the generalized t distribution introduced by McDonald and Newey, the skewed t proposed by Hansen, the skewed Laplace distribution, the generalized error distribution (also known as the generalized normal distribution), a skewed normal distribution, the student t distribution, the skewed Cauchy distribution, the Laplace distribution, the uniform distribution, the normal distribution, and the Cauchy distribution. The graphic below, adapted from Hansen, McDonald, and Newey, shows which parameters should be set to obtain some of the different special values of the skewed generalized t distribution.

Skewed generalized error distribution
The Skewed Generalized Error Distribution (SGED) has the pdf:

where 

Also

Generalized t-distribution
The generalized t-distribution (GT) has the pdf:  

where 

Skewed t-distribution
The skewed t-distribution (ST) has the pdf:

where 

Also

Skewed Laplace distribution
The skewed Laplace distribution (SLaplace) has the pdf:

where 

Also

Generalized error distribution
The generalized error distribution (GED, also known as the generalized normal distribution) has the pdf:

where 

Skewed normal distribution
The skewed normal distribution (SNormal) has the pdf:

where 

Also

The distribution should not be confused with the skew normal distribution or another asymmetric version.

Student's t-distribution
The Student's t-distribution (T) has the pdf:

 was substituted.

Skewed Cauchy distribution
The skewed cauchy distribution (SCauchy) has the pdf:

The mean, variance, skewness, and kurtosis of the skewed Cauchy distribution are all undefined.

Laplace distribution
The Laplace distribution has the pdf:

 was substituted.

Uniform Distribution
The uniform distribution has the pdf:

Normal distribution
The normal distribution has the pdf:

where 

Cauchy Distribution
The Cauchy distribution has the pdf:

 was substituted.

References

External links
 outlines skewed generalized t distribution, its special cases, and a program to calculate its pdf, cdf, and critical values
 online demo https://www.desmos.com/calculator/hfb11etkeq

Notes

Continuous distributions
Normal distribution
Probability distributions with non-finite variance
Location-scale family probability distributions